Kardam Buttress (Kardamov Rid \kar-'da-mov 'rid\) is a sloping buttress projecting 1 km northwards from St. Ivan Rilski Col into Huron Glacier on Livingston Island in the South Shetland Islands, Antarctica, and has precipitous and partly ice-free western slopes.  Surmounting Huron Glacier to the north.  It is named after the Bulgarian ruler Khan Kardam.

Location

Map
 L.L. Ivanov. Antarctica: Livingston Island and Greenwich, Robert, Snow and Smith Islands. Scale 1:120000 topographic map.  Troyan: Manfred Wörner Foundation, 2009.

References
 Kardam Buttress. SCAR Composite Antarctic Gazetteer
 Bulgarian Antarctic Gazetteer. Antarctic Place-names Commission. (details in Bulgarian, basic data in English)

External links
 Kardam Buttress. Copernix satellite image

Landforms of Livingston Island